When the sun... (Greek: Όταν ο ήλιος) is a novel written by the Greek author Georges Sari in 1971. A French translation was published by Esprit Ouvert in 2004, Suisse.

Plot summary

Greece faces the German occupation, a tormenting way of life for Greeks. Zoe will grow up with the horror of famine; she will hope for something better. She will suffer. She will live with it till the end of Evil. Then the wild feast of Liberation takes place. Zoe is twenty years old! A new life is awaiting her...
In the pages of this novel, that became a “classic”, famine, resistance against the oppressor, fear and optimism for a better future are described with sensitivity and a restrained sense of tragedy.

Greek novels
1971 novels